Neoheterandria is a genus of poeciliids native to Panama and Colombia.

Species
There are currently three recognized species in this genus:
 Neoheterandria cana (Meek & Hildebrand, 1913)
 Neoheterandria elegans Henn, 1916
 Neoheterandria tridentiger (Garman, 1895)

References

Poeciliidae
Freshwater fish genera
Ray-finned fish genera
Freshwater fish of Central America
Freshwater fish of South America